Abacoleptus is a genus of beetles in the family Carabidae, containing the following species: The genus was first described by Charles Adolphe Albert Fauvel in 1903.

 Abacoleptus carinatus Fauvel, 1903
 Abacoleptus curtus Will, 2011
 Abacoleptus paradoxus Heller, 1916

References

Pterostichinae
Taxa named by Charles Adolphe Albert Fauvel
Taxa described in 1903